is a city located in Nara Prefecture, Japan. As of August 1, 2019, the city has an estimated population of 37,352, and 14,775 households.
The population density is 1,107 persons per km2, and the total area is 33.73 km2.

The modern city of Katsuragi was established on October 1, 2004, from the merger of the towns of Shinjō and Taima (both from Kitakatsuragi District).

Katsuragi has a deep history being located in the ancient capital of Japan, Nara.  Katsuragi has many temples, shrines and tombs, many which contain important national treasures and important cultural properties.

Katsuragi has a rich natural environment. To the west lies the Kongo ranges which includes the mountains of Mt. Nijo, Mt. Iwahashi and Mt. Katsuragi.

The east side of Katsuragi City includes the commercial and residential areas with National Route 24, railway stations and the Katsuragi River.

The climate is generally mild and is classified as an inland climate. The temperature change during the day can be wide.  It is hot in summer and cold in winter with a little bit of snow.

Landmarks

Buddhist temples 

 Taimadera
 Sekko-ji

Shrines 

 Fuefuki Shrine
 Nagao Shrine
 Kakinomoto Shrine

Tomb 

 Tomb of Prince Otsu
 Imperial mausoleum of Empress Iitoyo

Mountains 

 Mt Katsuragi
Mt Nijo
Mt Iwahashiyama
 Mt Kongo

Other 

 Sumo Pavillion
Takenouchi route
Sanroku Park
Katsuragi city history museum

Notable people 
Katsuragi city has a rich history and is known for being connected to famous princes, princesses and poets. Some of their tombs can still be visited in Katsuragi City today.

 Kakinomotono Hitomaro
 Princess Chujyo (Chujyohime)
 Empress Iitoyo (Iitoyo Tenno)
 Princess Oku (Okunohimemiko) and Prince Otsu (Otsunomiko)
 Shiba Ryotaro
 Maekawa Samio

Neighboring municipalities
 Nara Prefecture
 Yamatotakada
 Gose
 Kashiba
 Osaka Prefecture
 Taishi
 Kanan
 Chihayaakasaka

Education

Junior high schools
 Shinjo Junior High School
 Hakuhou Junior High School

Elementary schools
 Shinjo Elementary School
 Shinjokita Elementary School
 Oshimi Elementary School
 Iwaki Elementary School
 Taima Elementary School

Transportation

Rail
 Kintetsu Railway
 Minami Osaka Line: Nijō-jinjaguchi Station - Taimadera Station - Iwaki Station - Shakudo Station
 Gose Line: Shakudo Station - Kintetsu Shinjo Station - Oshimi Station
 West Japan Railway Company
 Wakayama Line: Yamato-Shinjo Station

Road
Expressways
Minami-Hanna Road
Japan National Route 24
Japan National Route 165
Japan National Route 166
Japan National Route 168

References

External links

Katsuragi City official website (in Japanese)
Katsuragi City official website (in English)
 

Cities in Nara Prefecture
Populated places established in 2004